Tetralobinae is a subfamily of click beetles in the family Elateridae. There are about 7 genera and more than 20 described species in Tetralobinae.

Genera
These seven genera belong to the subfamily Tetralobinae:
 Neotetralobus Girard, 1987
 Paratetralobus Laurent, 1964
 Piezophyllus Hope, 1842
 Pseudalaus Laurent, 1967
 Pseudotetralobus Schwarz, 1902
 Sinelater Laurent, 1967
 Tetralobus Lepeletier & Audinet-Serville, 1828

References

Further reading

 

Elateridae
Taxa described in 1840